Freshford may refer to:

Freshford, County Kilkenny, a village in Ireland
Freshford, Somerset, a village and civil parish in England
Freshford railway station